Manche is a French department in Lower Normandy.

Manche or La Manche may also refer to:
 English Channel
 Daniel Manche (born 1993), American child actor
 French frigate Manche (1806)
 La Manche, Newfoundland and Labrador, a former community in Canada
 La Manche Provincial Park, in Newfoundland and Labrador, Canada
 Manche Ch'ol, a former Maya people
 Manche Sanchez, a character on the television series Prison Break
 Neck (music), part of musical instruments, particularly used in French music

See also 
 La Mancha, a region of Spain